The Nun 2 is an upcoming American gothic supernatural horror film directed by Michael Chaves and written by Akela Cooper, Ian Goldberg, and Richard Naing from a story by Cooper and James Wan. It serves as the sequel to The Nun (2018) and the ninth installment in The Conjuring Universe franchise. The film stars Storm Reid, Taissa Farmiga, and Anna Popplewell. Wan and Peter Safran return as co-producers, with Judson Scott also serving as a producer.

The film is scheduled to be released on September 8, 2023 by Warner Bros. Pictures.

Synopsis 
Set four years after the ending  of The Nun, the film follows Sister Irene as she once again comes face to face with the demonic force Valak, the Nun.

Cast 
 Storm Reid
 Taissa Farmiga as Sister Irene
 Anna Popplewell as Kate
 Katelyn Rose Downey as Sophie
 Bonnie Aarons as the Nun
 Jonas Bloquet as Frenchie

Production

Development 
In August 2017, Wan discussed the possibility of a Nun sequel and what its story may be: "I do know where potentially, if The Nun works out, where The Nun 2 could lead to and how that ties back to Lorraine's story that we've set up with the first two Conjurings and make it all come full circle."

In April 2019, it was announced by Peter Safran that a sequel was in development. Safran stated that there was a "really fun" storyline planned for the film and commented that there was an "inevitability to another The Nun movie". Later that month, Akela Cooper signed onto the project as screenwriter, while Safran and James Wan will serve as producers.

In February 2022, Taissa Farmiga stated that she has had discussions with Warner Bros. Pictures to reprise her role from the first film while stating that the restrictions on the film industry as a result of the coronavirus pandemic had delayed the project. In April 2022, Warner Bros. Pictures officially announced the movie as a part of its upcoming slate at the 2022 CinemaCon. The following day, it was announced that Michael Chaves will direct the film.

In September 2022, it was revealed that Ian Goldberg and Richard Naing had contributed as screenwriting co-authors of the most recent draft of the script.

Casting 
In April 2022, James Wan confirmed that Bonnie Aarons would be reprising her role as Valak. In September 2022, Storm Reid was cast as the new lead. In October 2022, Taissa Farmiga and Jonas Bloquet were confirmed to be reprising their roles from the first film, with Anna Popplewell and Katelyn Rose Downey added to the cast later that month.

Filming
Preliminary production photography began on April 29, 2022. Filming was originally scheduled to start on September 5, 2022. Principal photography began in France on October 6, 2022, and wrapped later that year.

Release 
The Nun 2 is scheduled to be released by Warner Bros. Pictures and New Line Cinema in the United States on September 8, 2023.

References

External links
 

2023 films
The Conjuring Universe
American supernatural horror films
Films produced by James Wan
New Line Cinema films
Upcoming films
Upcoming English-language films
Warner Bros. films
Films directed by Michael Chaves
2023 horror films